Big Sulphur Creek is a westward-flowing stream in northern Sonoma County, California, United States, which springs from The Geysers in the Mayacamas Mountains and runs  to empty into the Russian River.

Course
The creek originates on Pine Mountain in the Geysers area, near the Lake County line. It descends to the west, passing north of Sheepskin Rock. North of Mercuryville, it meets Geysers Road, which it parallels the rest of the way to the City of Cloverdale. After Hot Springs Creek and Cobb Creek enter from the right, Big Sulphur Creek passes Geysers Resort and Eagle Rock. Then Truitt Creek enters from the left, Squaw Creek and Frasier Creek enter from the right, and Little Sulphur Creek enters from the left.

Watershed

Habitat and pollution
When surveyed in 1973, Big Sulphur Creek supported snakes, salamanders, frogs, many kinds of fish (both steelhead and rainbow trout, Sacramento pikeminnow, suckers and roach), flies (trichoptera, diptera, hemiptera, plecoptera and odonata), and aquatic plants (sedges, cattails, and algae).

As of 2000, the creek and two of its tributaries (Little Sulphur Creek and Squaw Creek) still supported steelhead trout.

Bridges
Big Sulphur Creek is spanned by two bridges:
 River Road crosses northeast of Cloverdale, California on a  prestressed concrete span built in 1988.

See also
List of watercourses in the San Francisco Bay Area

References

Rivers of Sonoma County, California
Mayacamas Mountains
Tributaries of the Russian River (California)
Rivers of Northern California